Taylor Lake  may refer to:

 Taylor Lake (Cumberland)
 Taylor Lake (Guysborough)
 Taylor Lake (Hants)
 Taylor Lake (Nova Scotia)
 Taylor Lake (Quebec)
 Taylor Lake (Clay County, Arkansas), a lake in Clay County, Arkansas
 Taylor Lake (Texas)